The Taber Golden Suns were a Junior A ice hockey team in the Alberta Junior Hockey League based in Taber, Alberta, Canada.

History
The Golden Suns were founded in 1974 as an expansion club, lasting seven seasons before being sold and relocated to Olds, Alberta as the Olds Grizzlys.  During their tenure, they reached the AJHL finals three times, losing each time.

The Golden Suns produced four NHLers during their time: Lindy Ruff, Rocky Saganiuk, Gord Williams and Earl Ingarfield, Jr.

Season-by-season record

Note: GP = Games played, W = Wins, L = Losses, T = Ties Pts = Points, GF = Goals for, GA = Goals against

Playoffs
1975 Lost Semi-final
Drumheller Falcons defeated Taber Golden Suns 4-games-to-1
1976 Lost Final
Taber Golden Suns defeated Calgary Canucks 4-games-to-3
Spruce Grove Mets defeated Taber Golden Suns 4-games-to-none
1977 Lost Final
Taber Golden Suns defeated Spruce Grove Mets 4-games-to-none
Second in semi-final round robin (2-2) vs. Calgary Canucks and Red Deer Rustlers
Calgary Canucks defeated Taber Golden Suns 4-games-to-1
1978 DNQ
1979 Lost Quarter-final
St. Albert Saints defeated Taber Golden Suns 4-games-to-1
1980 Lost Quarter-final
Calgary Spurs defeated Taber Golden Suns 3-games-to-2
1981 Lost Final
Taber Golden Suns defeated Calgary Canucks 3-games-to-2
Taber Golden Suns defeated Calgary Spurs 4-games-to-2
St. Albert Saints defeated Taber Golden Suns 4-games-to-3

See also
List of ice hockey teams in Alberta

References
Alberta Junior Hockey League website
AJHL Annual Guide & Record Book 2006-07

Defunct Alberta Junior Hockey League teams
Defunct ice hockey teams in Alberta
Defunct junior ice hockey teams in Canada
Ice hockey clubs established in 1974
Taber, Alberta
1974 establishments in Alberta
Sports clubs disestablished in 1981
1981 disestablishments in Alberta